Westwood can refer to two different areas within Houston:
 Westwood (district), Houston
 Westwood (subdivision), Houston